Dieter Schlindwein (born 7 February 1961) is a German former professional footballer who played as a full-back.

Club career 
In his youth Schlindwein played for FC Germania 06 Karlsdorf. With SV Waldhof Mannheim, who signed him in 1977, he promoted in 1983–84 to the Bundesliga.

In 1986, he moved to Werder Bremen but stayed just one season appearing only three times. He joined Eintracht Frankfurt for their 1987–88 campaign and won with SGE the DFB-Pokal in 1988.

From 1989–90 to 1995–96 he played for FC St. Pauli, where he captained the squad. His last professional match took place on 16 March 1996 against Borussia Mönchengladbach; FC St. Pauli lost 2–0. He bid farewell with a red card.

In total he took part in 186 Bundesliga and 214 second tier fixtures.

International career 
Schlindwein was capped five times for the Germany under-21 and once for the Germany national amateur team and once in the German olympic team that took part at the Olympic games in Los Angeles).

Style of play 
A qualified industrial clerk, Schlindwein earned the nickname Eisen-Dieter ("Iron Dieter") due to his rough playing style.

Honours
Eintracht Frankfurt
DFB-Pokal: 1987–88

References

External links
 Dieter Schlindwein at eintracht-archiv.de 

1961 births
Living people
German footballers
Association football fullbacks
Footballers at the 1984 Summer Olympics
Olympic footballers of West Germany
West German footballers
Germany under-21 international footballers
Bundesliga players
SV Waldhof Mannheim players
SV Werder Bremen players
Eintracht Frankfurt players
FC St. Pauli players